Rietveld, Dutch for field of reed, can refer to:

People
Gerrit Rietveld (1888–1964), Dutch designer and architect
Hugo Rietveld (1932–2016), Dutch crystallographer who invented the Rietveld refinement method
Kees Rietveld (born 1969), Dutch singer
Pelle Rietveld (born 1985), Dutch decathlete
Piet Rietveld (born 1952), Dutch economist
Wilhelmina Rietveld (1949–1973), Dutch-Canadian model

Places
 Rietveld, Giessenlanden, a hamlet near Arkel, Netherlands
 Rietveld, Woerden, a hamlet in the municipality Woerden, Netherlands
 Rietveld, Rijnwoude, a hamlet near Hazerswoude, Netherlands
 Rietveld, Nord, a hamlet near Wormhout, Nord, France

Other
 Rietveld refinement, a technique for use in the characterisation of crystalline materials
 Gerrit Rietveld Academie, a Dutch Academy of art and design
 Rietveld (software), a code review tool written by Guido van Rossum

Dutch-language surnames